Balin Dol is a village in the municipality of Gostivar, North Macedonia.

Demographics
As of the 2021 census, Balin Dol had 2,059 residents with the following ethnic composition:
Albanians 1,651
Macedonians 319
Persons for whom data are taken from administrative sources 72
Turks 13
Others 4

According to the 2002 census, the village had a total of 2501 inhabitants. Ethnic groups in the village include:

Albanians 2156
Macedonians 337
Serbs 3 
Bosniaks 1
Others 4

References

External links

Villages in Gostivar Municipality
Albanian communities in North Macedonia